This is a list of the 558 MPs or Members of Parliament elected to the 558 seats of the Parliament of Great Britain in 1747, the 10th Parliament of Great Britain.

List

External links 

 History of Parliament: Members 1754–1790
 History of Parliament: Constituencies 1754–1790

References 

1747
1747 in Great Britain
1747
Lists of Members of the Parliament of Great Britain